The 2020 Finnish Men's Curling Championship was held at the Kisakallio Sport Institute in Lohja from December 5, 2019 to February 9, 2020.

The team skipped by Kalle Kiiskinen won the championship (Kiiskinen won his ninth title as player but fifth title as skip).

The 2020 Finnish Women's Curling Championship was held simultaneously with this championship at the same arena.

Teams

Round Robin

  Teams to Medal Round

Medal Round

Final standings

References

External links

See also
2020 Finnish Women's Curling Championship

2020
Finnish Men's Curling Championship
Curling Men's Championship
Finnish Men's Curling Championship
Finnish Men's Curling Championship
Finnish Men's Curling Championship
Sports competitions in Lohja